Squadron may refer to:
 Squadron (army), a military unit of cavalry, tanks, or equivalent subdivided into troops or tank companies
 Squadron (aviation), a military unit that consists of three or four flights with a total of 12 to 24 aircraft, depending on the type of aircraft and the air force, naval or army air service
 Squadron (naval), a military unit of three to ten warships that may be part of a larger task group, task force, or a naval fleet; also an administrative unit for warships like submarines that usually operate alone
 Squadron (TV series), a 1982 BBC television series
 Squadron, Ellenoff, Plesent & Sheinfeld, a New York City law firm that practiced from 1970 to 2002
 Daniel Squadron (born November 9, 1979), former New York elected official
 Squadron Supreme, a fictional superhero team appearing in Marvel Comics
 Star Wars: Squadrons, a video game set in the Star Wars universe that simulates spaceship combat

See also
Squad (disambiguation)